"Take a Picture" is a song by Canadian singer Carly Rae Jepsen. It was released on 21 May 2013 as a digital download through School Boy and Interscope Records. The song was created through a partnership with Coca-Cola.

Background
Carly Rae Jepsen teamed up with Coca-Cola and American Idol to help her finish writing the song.

Live performances
On 15 May 2013, Carly Rae Jepsen performed the song live during the Top 2 Performance Show on American singing competition series American Idol. The song was part of the setlist of The Summer Kiss Tour.

Track listing

Commercial performance
The song debuted atop South Korea International Singles with 35,704 downloads.

Charts

Release history

References

2013 singles
2013 songs
Carly Rae Jepsen songs
604 Records singles
Schoolboy Records singles
Interscope Records singles
Songs written by Carly Rae Jepsen